This is a list of episodes for the MediaCorp Channel 5 television series Point of Entry.

Season 1

Season 2

Season 3

Season 4

External links
Season 1 Episodic Synopsis on xinmsn
Season 3 Episodic Synopsis on xinmsn

Lists of Singaporean television series episodes